Daria Gavrilova and Irina Khromacheva were the 2012 champions, but Gavrilova was no longer eligible to compete in junior tennis, so was unable to defend her title. Khromacheva entered qualifying for the women's draw, but lost in the second qualifying round.

Czech pair Barbora Krejčíková and Kateřina Siniaková won their first junior grand slam, defeating the South American duo of Doménica González and Beatriz Haddad Maia in the final, 7–5, 6–2.

Seeds

Draw

Finals

Top half

Bottom half

External links 
 Draw

Girls' Doubles
French Open, 2013 Girls' Doubles